Maly Burtym is a rural locality (a village) in Lobanovskoye Rural Settlement, Permsky District, Perm Krai, Russia. The population was 78 as of 2010. There are 9 streets.

Geography 
Maly Burtym is located 26 km south of Perm (the district's administrative centre) by road. Balandino is the nearest rural locality.

References 

Rural localities in Permsky District